ISO 3166-2:DZ is the entry for Algeria in ISO 3166-2, part of the ISO 3166 standard published by the International Organization for Standardization (ISO), which defines codes for the names of the principal subdivisions (e.g., provinces or states) of all countries coded in ISO 3166-1.

Currently for Algeria, ISO 3166-2 codes are defined for 58 provinces.

Each code consists of two parts, separated by a hyphen. The second part is two digits:
 01–31: provinces created in 1974
 32–48: provinces created in 1983
 49–58: provinces created in 2019

Current codes
Subdivision names are listed as in the ISO 3166-2 standard published by the ISO 3166 Maintenance Agency (ISO 3166/MA).

Click on the button in the header to sort each column.

 Notes

Changes
The following changes to the entry are listed on ISO's online catalogue, the Online Browsing Platform:

See also
 Subdivisions of Algeria
 FIPS region codes of Algeria

External links
 ISO Online Browsing Platform: DZ
 Provinces of Algeria, Statoids.com

2:DZ
ISO 3166-2
Algeria geography-related lists